The ATP Challenger Tour, in 2016, was the secondary professional tennis circuit organized by the ATP. The 2016 ATP Challenger Tour calendar contained 166 tournaments, with prize money ranging from $40,000 up to $125,000. It was the 39th edition of challenger tournaments cycle, and 8th under the name of Challenger Tour.

Schedule 
This is the complete schedule of events on the 2016 calendar, with player progression documented from the quarterfinals stage.

January

February

March

April

May

June

July

August

September

October

November

Statistical information 
These tables present the number of singles (S) and doubles (D) titles won by each player and each nation during the season. The players/nations are sorted by: 1) total number of titles (a doubles title won by two players representing the same nation counts as only one win for the nation); 2) a singles > doubles hierarchy; 3) alphabetical order (by family names for players).

To avoid confusion and double counting, these tables should be updated only after an event is completed.

Titles won by player

Titles won by nation

Point distribution 
Points are awarded as follows:

References

External links 
 Official website
 January, February & March Calendar, as of 29th December 2015
 Tour Calendar

 
ATP Challenger Tour
ATP Challenger Tour